Ivanhoe School (formerly Ivanhoe College) is a coeducational secondary school located in Ashby-de-la-Zouch, Leicestershire, England.

The school was established in 1954 and named after the historical novel Ivanhoe by Sir Walter Scott, part of which was set at Ashby de la Zouch Castle.

It was previously a community middle school with specialist technology college status. In July 2012 Ivanhoe College converted to academy status. In September 2022 the school expanded its age range to 11, becoming a secondary school.

References 

Educational institutions established in 1954
Secondary schools in Leicestershire
1954 establishments in England
Academies in Leicestershire
Ashby-de-la-Zouch

There are fights